The 2015 Malaysia Cup (Malay: Piala Malaysia 2015) was the 89th edition of Malaysia Cup tournament organised by the Football Association of Malaysia.

The 2015 Malaysia Cup began on August with a preliminary round. A total of 16 teams took part in the competition. The teams were divided into four groups, each containing four teams. The group leaders and runners-up teams in the groups after six matches qualified to the quarterfinals.

Pahang were the defending champions, having beaten Johor Darul Takzim on a penalty shootout 5–3 in last season's final, but they were eliminated by the eventual winner, Selangor, in the semi-finals. Selangor won the trophy after beating Kedah 2–0.

This edition also marked the last appearance of LionsXII in this competition.

Format 
In the competition, the top 10 teams from 2015 Malaysia Super League were joined by the top 4 teams from 2015 Malaysia Premier League. The remaining two teams from 2015 Malaysia Super League and the team who finished 5th and 6th place in the 2015 Malaysia Premier League competed in the playoffs for the remaining 2 spots. The teams were drawn into four groups of four teams.

Round and draw dates
The draw for the 2015 Malaysia Cup was held on 27 August 2015 at the Hilton Petaling Jaya with the participating team coaches and captains in attendance.

Play-off

Seeding

Group stage

Group A

Group B

Group C

Group D

Knockout stage

In the knockout phase, teams played against each other over two legs on a home-and-away basis, except for the one-match final. The mechanism of the draws for each round was as follows:
In the draw for the quarter final, the fourth group winners were seeded, and the fourth group runners-up were unseeded. The seeded teams were drawn against the unseeded teams, with the seeded teams hosting the second leg. Teams from the same group or the same association could not be drawn against each other.
In the draws for the quarter-finals onwards, there were no seedings, and teams from the same group or the same association could be drawn against each other.

Bracket

Quarter-finals
The first legs were played on 24 November, and the second legs were played on 28 November 2015.

Semi-finals
The first legs were played on 2 December, and the second legs were played on 6 December 2015.

Final

The final will be played on 12 December 2015 at the Shah Alam Stadium in Shah Alam, Selangor.

Statistics

Top scorers 
Statistics exclude play-off round.

Source:

Winners

References

External links
Football Malaysia Official Website - (Malaysia Cup)

2015 in Malaysian football
Malaysia Cup seasons